Lorenzo James Henrie (born June 29, 1993) is an American actor. He is known for his role as Chris Manawa on the AMC television series Fear the Walking Dead (2015–2016).

Early life
Henrie was born in Phoenix, Arizona, to Linda (née Finocchiaro), a talent manager, and James Wilson Henrie, a producer formerly in real estate. His older brother is actor David Henrie. His maternal grandparents were Italian.

Career 
In 2015, Henrie appeared in the comedy film Paul Blart: Mall Cop 2. He also played one of the lead roles as Christopher Manawa in the  first two seasons of AMC's series Fear the Walking Dead.

Filmography

Film

Television

Awards and nominations

References

External links 
 

Living people
1993 births
Male actors from Phoenix, Arizona
American male film actors
American male television actors
21st-century American male actors
American male child actors
American people of Italian descent